Boatbill can refer to a number of bird species:
 the boat-billed heron, Cochlearius cochlearius
 the boat-billed flycatcher, Megarynchus pitangua
 either of the two boatbills in the genus Machaerirhynchus:
 Black-breasted boatbill, M. nigripectus 
 Yellow-breasted boatbill, M. flaviventer